Xenophon is an unincorporated community in Hancock County, Tennessee, United States.

References

Unincorporated communities in Hancock County, Tennessee
Unincorporated communities in Tennessee